The 2004–05 Anycall Professional Basketball season was the ninth season of the Korean Basketball League.

Regular season

Playoffs

Prize money
Wonju TG Sambo Xers: KRW 150,000,000 (champions + regular-season 1st place)
Jeonju KCC Egis: KRW 80,000,000 (runners-up + regular-season 2nd place)
Anyang SBS Stars: KRW 20,000,000 (regular-season 3rd place)

External links
Official KBL website (Korean & English)

2004–05
2004–05 in South Korean basketball
2004–05 in Asian basketball leagues